Sean Curley (born 1995) is an American actor. He is the singing voice of Pablo on The Backyardigans and a pig named Spencer on Whoopi's Littleburg.  He also played Josh Learner in Reservation Road. On Broadway, he has been in Fiddler on the Roof and Beauty and the Beast. He is also a member of The Broadway Kids and the Nautical Stars Theater Company.

Credits

Film

Television

Stage

References

External links 
Broadway Kids Sean Curley

1995 births
American male child actors
American child singers
Living people
21st-century American singers